This list of the tallest buildings in Brazil ranks Brazilian skyscrapers in order by height. Most of Brazil's tallest buildings are located in Balneário Camboriú, Goiânia and São Paulo, which is the biggest financial and residential center of the country. The majority of these buildings are residential.

At  the Yachthouse Residence Club - Towers 1 and 2, in Balneário Camboriú, are the tallest buildings in Brazil. The first skyscraper in Brazil was the  105-meter-tall Martinelli Building in São Paulo, completed in 1929.

Tallest buildings

See also

 List of tallest buildings in South America

References

External links
 Skyscrapers.com
 Emporis Corporation
 Skyscraper Page